A research group is a group of researchers often from the same faculty, specialized on the same subject, working together on the issue or topic.

The success of research group depends on several factors like, clear goals, research emphasis, group climate, participative governance, decentralized organization, communication, resources, recruitment, selection, and leadership.

Research groups may be mistaken for study groups; study groups are often are more casual as well as being used by younger students.

References